Rooster is the self-titled debut album by English indie rock band Rooster. Released on 24 January 2005, the album reached number three on the UK Albums Chart and spawned four commercially successful singles, two of which peaked in the top ten of the UK Singles Chart. The album also charted at number 26 on the Irish Albums Chart. "On the Road" featured in the movie Stormbreaker.

Track listing

Personnel
Rooster
Nick Atkinson – vocals
Luke Potashnick – guitars
Ben Smyth – bass guitar, backing vocals
Dave Neale – drums

Additional personnel

Steve Robson – production on tracks 1, 3, 4, 8 and 10
Pete Woodroffe – production on tracks 2, 5, 7, 11 and 12
Charlie Grant – production on tracks 2, 5, 7, 11 and 12
Mark Wallis – production on tracks 6 and 9
David Ruffy – production on tracks 6 and 9
Chris Griffiths – production on track 6
Tony Griffiths – production on track 6

Ash Howes – mixing
John Davis – mastering
Andy Carne – photography, art direction, graphic design

Charts

Certifications

References

Rooster (band) albums
2004 albums
Albums produced by Steve Robson